Pensacola Barracudas may refer to:

 Pensacola Barracudas (arena football), American football team
 Pensacola Barracudas (soccer), soccer team